The Committee for Education is a Northern Ireland Assembly committee established to advise, assist and scrutinise the work of the Department of Education and Minister for Education (currently Peter Weir (politician))on matters within his or her responsibility as a minister. The committee undertakes a scrutiny, policy development and consultation role and plays a key role in the consideration and development of legislation.

Membership

References

External links 
 Official website

Northern Ireland Assembly